The Elvish Linguistic Fellowship (E. L. F.) is a "Special Interest Group" of the Mythopoeic Society devoted to the study of J. R. R. Tolkien's constructed languages, headed by the computer scientist Carl F. Hostetter. It was founded by Jorge Quiñónez in 1988.

Organising Tolkien's language writings 

In 1992, Christopher Tolkien appointed the editors of the E.L.F. to order, edit, and then publish his father's writings concerning his constructed languages. They have worked from photocopies of the materials sent to them and from notes taken by the group's members in the Bodleian and Marquette University Tolkien manuscript archives. This main course of publication was being carried out in the journal Parma Eldalamberon, until it halted in June 2015. There are, however, some writings that are largely independent, and/or whose context has been sufficiently established by Christopher Tolkien's own chronological publication efforts in The History of Middle-earth, and so do not have to be presented in the normal chronological flow of the larger project. Such materials are being published in the journal Vinyar Tengwar. Members include Christopher Gilson, Carl F. Hostetter, Arden R. Smith, Bill Welden, and Patrick H. Wynne.

Journals 

The E. L. F. publishes two journals, Vinyar Tengwar, edited by Hostetter, and Parma Eldalamberon, edited by Christopher Gilson. There is also an online journal, Tengwestië, edited by Hostetter and Patrick H. Wynne; and it also sponsors the Lambengolmor mailing list.

Parma Eldalamberon 

Parma Eldalamberon (broken Quenya for 'The Book of Elven-tongues') was founded in 1971 as a fanzine devoted to a variety of invented literary languages, published under the auspices of the Mythopoeic Society. Today it is an irregular publication dedicated to the editing of Tolkien's manuscripts describing his Elvish Languages. It is edited by Christopher Gilson. It has no ISSN or ISBN number. 

In 1995, with the support of Christopher Tolkien and permission of the Tolkien Estate, Parma was reinvented as a series of standalone volumes publishing in full material from Tolkien's manuscripts relating to languages and scripts.  Much of this material was previously unpublished or published only in heavily edited form (for example, selections from the "Gnomish Lexicon" published in full in Parma Eldalamberon #11 were published in the Appendices to The Book of Lost Tales.). For a list of material by Tolkien published in Parma Eldalamberon 1995 to date, see Elvish languages (Middle-earth)#Bibliography.

Vinyar Tengwar 

Vinyar Tengwar (broken Quenya for "News Letters") is a refereed journal published by the Elvish Linguistic Fellowship, dedicated to the study of the languages constructed by J. R. R. Tolkien. The publication is indexed by the Modern Language Association. 

Vinyar Tengwar first appeared in 1988, at first edited by Jorge Quiñónez and later taken over by Hostetter. It appeared in bimonthly intervals at first, but after July 1994, issues appeared more irregularly, roughly once a year, until #49 appeared in June 2007; there was then a hiatus until March 2013, when issue #50 appeared. As of 2020, no further issues had been published. The journal was dedicated primarily to the editing of Tolkien's linguistic texts, some of which were mentioned in volumes of The History of Middle-earth, edited by Christopher Tolkien, but not published in that series owing to their specialist nature.

ELFcon

The ELFcon was the annual open conference of the E.L.F that was held from 1991 to 1994. Its purpose was to present scholarly papers on any subject relating to Tolkien's invented languages, to discuss the papers amongst the attendees, and to serve as a friendly gathering for a common intellectual pursuit. ELFcons ended in 1994, but Tolkienist conventions organized by Bill Welden continue.

References

External links

 Mythopoeic Society, the parent organization of ELF

Tolkien linguistic studies
Linguistics journals
Publications established in 1988